Albert Bedford (12 September 1932 – 25 March 2001) was an Australian cricketer. He played fifteen first-class matches for South Australia between 1956 and 1959.

References

External links
 

1932 births
2001 deaths
Australian cricketers
South Australia cricketers
Cricketers from Adelaide